Peter Kioso (born 15 August 1999) is an Irish professional footballer who plays as a wing-back for Championship side Rotherham United.

Early life
Kioso was born in Swords, Dublin. He and his family later moved to Milton Keynes, England in 2010.

Club career

Early career
Kioso joined the academy of Milton Keynes Dons at the age of 14 and progressed to the club's under-18 side before being released in 2017. He had a brief spell with non-league Dunstable Town before joining National League club Hartlepool United where he remained for two seasons, making 70 appearances and scoring 4 goals.

Luton Town
On 22 January 2020, Kioso joined Championship club Luton Town for an undisclosed fee. Luton manager Graeme Jones said Kioso was "one for the future", and in March 2020 said he had been "impressed" by Kioso in training, and would consider giving him his debut. He made his Football League debut for Luton on 18 July 2020.

On 15 October 2020 he moved on loan to League Two club Bolton Wanderers. He made his debut two days later in a 1–2 home defeat against Oldham Athletic. Two days after that he scored Bolton's first goal in a 3–3 draw against Barrow. On 11 January 2021 Luton recalled Kioso from his loan after an injury to James Bree.

On 25 January 2021, Kioso joined League One side Northampton Town on loan for the remainder of the 2020–21 season. Kioso had already played for Luton and Bolton in the 2020–2021 season, usually meaning he wouldn't be able to sign for a third team as players can only play for two teams in one season – however FIFA changed the rules for that season to allow players to play for three teams, to alleviate the effects of the coronavirus pandemic on football.

He returned to his academy club Milton Keynes Dons on loan on 31 August 2021. Kioso scored his first goal since his return to the club on 18 September 2021 in a 4–1 away win over Gillingham. On 18 January 2022, Kioso was recalled to Luton from his loan.

Rotherham United
On 23 June 2022, it was announced that Kioso had signed for Championship club Rotherham United on a permanent basis.

Personal life
Kioso's parents are from DR Congo. His brother Gedeon is also a footballer; the two played together at Dunstable Town, with Peter at right back and his brother at left back. His cousin Pelly-Ruddock Mpanzu is also a footballer; the two played together at Luton Town.

Career statistics

Honours
Bolton Wanderers
EFL League Two third-place (promotion): 2020–21

References

1999 births
Living people
Republic of Ireland association footballers
Milton Keynes Dons F.C. players
Dunstable Town F.C. players
Hartlepool United F.C. players
Luton Town F.C. players
Bolton Wanderers F.C. players
Northampton Town F.C. players
Rotherham United F.C. players
Association football fullbacks
National League (English football) players
English Football League players
Irish people of Democratic Republic of the Congo descent
Irish sportspeople of African descent
Black Irish sportspeople
Irish expatriate sportspeople in England
Expatriate footballers in England
Republic of Ireland expatriate association footballers